Sally Mayara da Silva (born  in Jaraguá do Sul) is a Brazilian bobsledder.

Da Silva competed at the 2014 Winter Olympics for Brazil. She teamed with Fabiana Santos in the two-woman event, finishing 19th.

References

1987 births
Living people
Olympic bobsledders of Brazil
Sportspeople from Santa Catarina (state)
Bobsledders at the 2014 Winter Olympics
Brazilian female bobsledders